Wisk'achani (Aymara wisk'acha a rodent, -ni a suffix to indicate ownership, "the one with the viscacha", Hispanicized spelling Viscachani) is a   mountain in the Chilla-Kimsa Chata mountain range in the Andes of Bolivia. It is situated in the La Paz Department, Ingavi Province, Jesús de Machaca Municipality, north-east of Ch'ama (Chama). Wisk'achani lies north of the mountain Imill Wawani, north-east of Jisk'a Sallalla and Sallalla and south-east of Q'ullq'uni. The river Wila Jaqhi Jahuira ("red rock river", Wila Jakke Jahuira) originates east of the mountain. It flows to the north-east.

References 

Mountains of La Paz Department (Bolivia)